Infrared Spectrometer for ExoMars (ISEM) is an infrared spectrometer for remote sensing that is part of the science payload on board the European Space Agency Rosalind Franklin rover, tasked to search for biosignatures and biomarkers on Mars. The rover is planned to be launched in August–October 2022 and land on Mars in spring 2023.

ISEM will provide context assessment of the surface mineralogy in the vicinity of the Rosalind Franklin rover for selection of potential astrobiological targets. The Principal Investigator is Oleg Korablev from the Russian Space Research Institute (IKI).

Overview

The Infrared Spectrometer for ExoMars (ISEM) is being developed by the Russian Space Research Institute (IKI). It will be the first instance of near-infrared spectroscopy (NIR) observations done from the Mars surface. The instrument will be installed on the Rosalind Franklin rover's mast to measure reflected solar radiation in the near infrared range for context assessment of the surface mineralogy in the vicinity of Rosalind Franklin for selection of potential astrobiological targets. As the number of samples obtained with the drill will be limited, the selection of high-value sites for drilling will be crucial. Working with PanCam (a high-resolution panoramic camera), ISEM will aid in the selection of potential targets, especially water-bearing minerals, for close-up investigations and drilling sites.

ISEM could detect, if present, organic compounds, including evolving trace gases such as hydrocarbons like methane in the Martian atmosphere.

Objectives

The stated science objectives of ISEM are:  
 Geological investigation and study a composition of Martian soils in the uppermost few millimeters of the surface.
 Characterisation of the composition of surface materials, discriminating between various classes of silicates, oxides, hydrated minerals and carbonates.
 Identification and mapping of the distribution of aqueous alteration products on Mars.
 Real-time assessment of surface composition in selected areas, in support of identifying and selection of the most promising drilling sites. 
 Studies of variations of the atmospheric dust properties and of the atmospheric gaseous composition.

Development

ISEM is a derivative of the Lunar Infrared Spectrometer (LIS) being developed by the Russian Space Research Institute (IKI) in Moscow for the planned Luna-25 and Luna-27 Russian landers. Collaborating institutions include: Moscow State University, Main Astrophysical Observatory, National Academy of Sciences of Ukraine, the National Research Institute for Physicotechnical and Radio Engineering Measurements (VNIIFTRI) in Russia, Moscow State University, and the Aberystwyth University in United Kingdom. The science team includes researchers from Russia, France, Italy, Sweden, Germany, the United Kingdom, and Canada.

The instrument has been designed to specifically detect carbonates, oxalates, borates, nitrates, NH4-bearing minerals, that are good indicators of past habitable conditions such as aqueous minerals. It is also designed to detect organic compounds, including polycyclic aromatic hydrocarbons (PAHs) and those containing aliphatic C-H molecules. In addition, ISEM can also detect seasonal frost, if present at the landing site, and it can be used to analyse the bore hole excavated by the ExoMars drill, if the rover backs away some distance.

See also

 Astrobiology
 Life on Mars

References

ExoMars
Spacecraft instruments
Astrobiology
Space science experiments
Space program of Russia